Nauloi was a town of ancient Cilicia. 

Its site is tentatively located near Mahmutlar, in Asiatic Turkey.

References

Populated places in ancient Cilicia
Former populated places in Turkey
History of Antalya Province